The West Coast Conference baseball championship is the conference baseball championship of the Division I West Coast Conference.  As begun in 2013, the top four finishers in the regular season of the league's ten teams participate in the double-elimination tournament held at Banner Island Ballpark in Stockton, California.  The winner of the event earns the conference's automatic bid to the NCAA Division I Baseball Championship.

History
The West Coast Conference was one of the few college baseball leagues not to conduct a postseason championship event until dividing into two divisions in 1999.  From that year through 2009, the league held a best of three game championship series between the two division winners.  Division play was abolished following the 2005 season, but the championship series continued with the top two finishers in the conference participating.  After 2009, the championship series was also discontinued.  However, in 2013, the league established a four team, double-elimination event at a neutral site.  This was the first time in baseball that more than two teams participated in a postseason conference championship event and the first time any conference championship event is held at a neutral site.

Champions

By year
This table lists results of West Coast Conference postseason conference championship events.

By team

Playoffs

Tournament

References